Blumenbachia is a genus of flowering plants belonging to the family Loasaceae.

Its native range is Southeastern and Southern Brazil to Southern South America.

Species:

Blumenbachia amana 
Blumenbachia catharinensis 
Blumenbachia dissecta 
Blumenbachia eichleri 
Blumenbachia espigneera 
Blumenbachia exalata 
Blumenbachia hieronymi 
Blumenbachia insignis 
Blumenbachia latifolia 
Blumenbachia prietea 
Blumenbachia scabra 
Blumenbachia silvestris

References

Loasaceae
Cornales genera